Soltero is a 1984 drama film written by Bienvenido Noriega Jr. and directed by Pio de Castro III for the Experimental Cinema of the Philippines. The film stars Jay Ilagan, Rio Locsin, and Chanda Romero and it tells the life of a soltero (young bachelor) living alone in his condominium apartment, working as an assistant manager at a bank, and how he manages his life with his family he loved and the past romances he had.

Summary

Crispin Rodriguez is the soltero (bachelor) of the story, he is a 29-year old young man who lives in a condominium apartment all by himself and works as an assistant manager of the Traders Royal Bank in Manila. Most of the time, he spends his time hanging out with his office friends like going to parties at bars, eating at a restaurant, or watching movies at the Manila Film Center. However, since his age is nearing 30 and still lonely, the one thing he needed to complete his life is no other than a woman to love and become together.

Cast

Jay Ilagan as Crispin Rodriguez
Rio Locsin as Christina
Chanda Romero as RJ Juan
Baby Delgado as Nene
Dick Israel as Teddy
Bing Davao as Edwin
Cris Vertido as Joey
Alvin Enriquez as Bimbo
Irma Potenciano as Crispin's mother
Terrie Legarda as Bong
Luigi Sison		
Manuel Conde as Crispin's grandfather	
Robert Campos
Carmen Enriquez	
Mona Lisa as the old lady at the condominium		
Chito Ponce Enrile
Menggie Cobarrubias
Connie Angeles
Khryss Adalia	
Nanding Josef		
Jack Azarcon
Naty Santiago
Pong Pong
Bodjie Pascua as Theater Actor
Louie Pascasio as Theater Actor

Production
Throughout the whole life of Pio de Castro III as an actor, writer, and film critic, Soltero is the first of two films that he directed — the other film is Ina, Kasusuklaman Ba Kita?, which was released in 1985 and produced and distributed by Seiko Films. In an interview from TV Times, the film was shot within three months.

Digital restoration
The film was restored by the ABS-CBN Film Restoration Project, with the help of L’Immagine Ritrovata in Italy, Kantana Post-Production in Thailand, and Wildsound Studios in Quezon City. The restoration process of Soltero started in 2016 with a 4K digital scan at Ritrovata's main laboratory in Bologna, Italy and the film prints used in the scanning were in bad condition, which was caused by many obstacles including color decay, missing frames, and vinegar syndrome that affected the whole print. Just like the other films from the ECP, the film negatives were lost or destroyed and the restoration team decided to restore the films of the said company through positive prints. All of the existing prints of the Experimental Cinema of the Philippines library are stored and archived at the vaults of ABS-CBN Film Archives, located within the ELJ Communications Center in Quezon City.

However, the film's restoration process began to be rushed as the Serpent 70 denied ABS-CBN's hopes of giving a 25-year broadcast franchise and the team needed to complete it before its deadline on August 31.

On January 28, 2021, the restored version of the film was premiered digitally through KTX.ph, added with a pre-show hosted by ABS-CBN Film Archives head, Leo P. Katigbak, and the leading actresses Rio Locsin and Chanda Romero were present at the said pre-show.

Reception

Critical reception 
Jim Paranal of Film Police Reviews described Soltero as a "quiet movie" and despite its colorful depictions of the 1980s, the melancholy of the lead character Crispin can be felt by everyone and his traits cannot be drifted further from the generation of millennials and Gen Z. He praised the film's direction under Pio de Castro III, the written screenplay by Bienvenido Noriega Jr., and the performances of the cast, particularly the lead actor Jay Ilagan. The film also discusses the issues of depression, attempted suicide among males, and representation of lesbian women where Chanda Romero's character RJ accurately portrays the role.

Noel Vera, writing under his column Critic After Dark for BusinessWorld, praised the acting performance of Jay Ilagan and describes the film Soltero as an "unlikely but ultimately necessary treatment on loneliness in Philippine society".

Accolades

Notes

References

External links 

1984 films
Philippine drama films
1980s Tagalog-language films